Brannen Temple (born August 26, 1970) is a 3 time Grammy Award winning American drummer, who is best known as a drummer for acts like Eric Burdon, Robben Ford, Lizz Wright, Eric Johnson, and currently Ruthie Foster.

Born in Austin, Texas, he started playing drums at the age of 10, soon to play in school jazz bands.

Since the early 1990s, Temple is an accomplished session drummer and played on records by Chris Duarte, Patrice Rushen, Chris Smither, Abra Moore, Stephen Bruton, Jody Watley, Alejandro Escovedo, amongst others. In 1996 he was part of the first G3 Tour, drumming for Eric Johnson and was featured on their 1997 live album G3: Live in Concert.

Since the new millennium he has also played on records by Toni Price, Bob Schneider, Lavelle White, Darden Smith, Robben Ford, Bobby Whitlock, Katie Armiger and appeared on Robert Rodriguez' motion picture soundtrack Grindhouse: Planet Terror (2007).

He was the live drummer of Eric Burdon & The Animals from 2009 until 2013. Since 2010 he also tours on and off with Chris Duarte Group, jazz vocalist Lizz Wright and keyboardist Bobby Sparks. Temple received several Austin Music Awards over the years for "Best Drummer" or "Best Jazz Band" categories for his bands Hot Buttered Rhythm, Blaze and Black Red Black. And in 2020 as a part of the studio band for guitar / vocalist Gary Clark Jr. he received a Grammy for "Best Rock Performance", "Best Contemporary Blues Album" and "Best Rock Song" for the album and song title This Land.

He resides in Austin and has several local jazz/funk bands, amongst them Temple Underground and Black Red Black (featuring Red Young and Ephraim Owens) and now "The Brannen and Red Show" (drums and organ duo). He has worked with Janet Jackson, Rose McGowan, Fastball, Monte Montgomery, Sheena Easton, Kevin Paige, Jimmie Vaughan, Dixie Chicks, Lee Roy Parnell, Jody Watley, Patrice Rushen and Chaka Khan.

Discography
 1992 – Mitch Watkins – Strings With Wings
 1994 – Chris Duarte Group – Texas Sugar
 1994 – Chris Duarte Group – Austin. Texas
 1994 – Patrice Rushen – Anything But Ordinary
 1995 – Chris Smither – Up on the Lowdown
 1995 – Jody Watley – Affection
 1995 – Abra Moore – Sing
 1995 – Stephen Bruton – Right on Time
 1995 – Mitch Watkins – Humhead
 1996 – Alejandro Escovedo – With These Hands
 1996 – Tormenta – Tormenta
 1996 – Joel Nava – Soy Otro
 1997 – Abra Moore – Strangest Places
 1997 – Lavelle White – It Haven't Been Easy
 1997 – Hot Buttered Rhythm – Hot Buttered Rhythm
 1997 – G3 – Live in Concert
 1997 – David Ryan Harris – David Ryan Harris
 1997 – Chris Smither – Small Relevations
 1998 – Ramino Herrera – Con El Mismo Amor
 1998 – Jeff Robinson – Any Shade of Blue
 1999 – 8 1/2 Souvenirs – Twisted Desire
 1999 – Stephen Bruton – Nothing But The Truth
 1999 – Chris Smither – Drive You Home Again
 2000 - Clay Moore - To A Tee
 2000 – Tina Lear – The Road Home
 2000 – Seela Misra – Something Happened
 2000 – Willie Oteri – Concepts of Mate Matoot
 2001 – Toni Price – Midnight Pumpkin
 2001 – Brent Palmer – Boomerang Shoes
 2001 – Laura Scarborough – The Project Live
 2002 – Bob Schneider – The Galaxy Kings
 2002 – Stephen Bruton – Spirit World
 2002 – Chris Thomas King – A Young Man's Blues
 2003 – Lavelle White – Into The Mystic
 2003 – Blaze – Aural Karate
 2003 – Nicknack – Mustard Seed
 2004 - Clay Moore - ¡Damelo!
 2004 – Javier Vercher – Introducing Jarvier Vercher Trio
 2004 – Fastball – Keep Your Wig On
 2004 – Darden Smith – Circo
 2006 – Leni Stern – Love Comes Quietly
 2006 – Gecko Turner – Chandalismo Illustrado
 2007 – Bobby Whitlock – Lovers
 2007 – Greg Koch – Live on the Radio (featuring Joe Bonamassa and Robben Ford)
 2008 – Michael Cross – Blues Lovin' Man
 2009 – Radney Foster – Revival
 2010 – Katie Armiger – The Confessions of a Nice Girl
 2010 – Carrie Rodriguez – The New Bye & Bye
 2010 – Betty Buckley – Bootleg: Boardmixes From The Road
 2011 – Geno Stroia II – From The Hip
 2011 – Lizz Wright – Tiny Desk Concert
 2012 – Erik Sanne – De Fantastische Expeditie
 2013 – Eric Burdon – 'Til Your River Runs Dry
 2016 – Will Knaak – The Only Open Road
 2017 – Eric Johnson – Collage

DVDs
 2005 – Robben Ford – New Morning: The Paris Concert

References

External links
 Official website
 

American male drummers
American jazz drummers
Musicians from Austin, Texas
Living people
1970 births
20th-century American drummers
Jazz musicians from Texas
21st-century American drummers
20th-century American male musicians
21st-century American male musicians
American male jazz musicians